Alphonse Frédéric De Moerloose, born in Gentbrugge, Belgium, on January 12, 1858, and died in Schilde, Belgium, on March 27, 1932 (aged 74) was a priest of the Congregation of the Immaculate Heart of Mary [CICM] and a Belgian architect. He was a missionary in China from 1885 to 1929 and built several Catholic churches there.

Life 
Alphonse De Moerloose was the 10th and the youngest child of Jean-Baptiste De Moerloose and Marie-Thérèse De Jaeger, a French speaking family living in Gentbrugge, Flanders.

His father started out as a mason, to rise as an entrepreneur and alderman in charge of public works in Gentbrugge. Two of his brothers were entrepreneurs, as well as one of his brothers-in-law, Edouard Van Herrewege, and an older sister was married to the architect Ferdinand de Noyette (1838-1870) and remarried to his brother Modeste of Noyette (1847-1923). The latter was an important architect creating civil and religious buildings in the neo-Gothic style in Flanders.
Alphonse De Moerloose must have been influenced by his brother-in-law Modeste de Noyette. He began by studying architecture brilliantly from 1876. He obtained on August 7, 1881 the first prize in the fifth year of his studies in architecture at the École supérieure des arts Saint-Luc in Ghent.

At that time, the education of this school lasted seven years with evening and weekend lessons. During the day, he probably had to work with his father. The most gifted students could follow an eighth year which led to the "Grand Prix". The milieu of the Saint-Luc school of the arts defended an ultramontane Catholicism opposed to the secularization of society and to liberalism. Under the influence of Baron Jean-Baptiste Bethune, the teaching of architecture promoted the neo-Gothic style.
The De Moerloose family was very Catholic. Driven by a missionary desire De Moerloose entered the Seminary of Scheut, in Anderlecht (near Brussels) of the Congregation of the Immaculate Heart of Mary in October 1881, founded in 1862 by Théophile Verbist. This missionary congregation had been assigned by the Congregation for the Evangelization of Peoples, in 1865, the apostolic mission of Inner Mongolia. Alphonse De Moerloose was ordained a priest on June 7, 1884 and pronounced his religious vows in the chapel of the seminary of Scheut on February 6, 1885.

He arrived in China in 1885 and was assigned to the Apostolic Vicariate of the Province of Gansu whose evangelization was entrusted to the Scheutists by the Holy See in 1878. The Scheutist missionaries had established themselves in the cities of Lanzhou , Liangzhou and Ganzhou.

The missionary Alphonse De Moerloose then adopted a Chinese name He Gengbo (和羹柏). He spent a year in the residence of Xixiang, in Wuwei (Gansu) to learn the basics of the Chinese language, then worked in rural and urban parishes.
In 1898, Jérôme-Josse Van Aertselaer (1845-1924) was appointed vicar apostolic of “Central Mongolia” where he had previously been director of the seminary before being, between 1887 and 1898, superior general of the congregation  . The latter will redirect the missionary career of Alphonse De Moerloose. He left Gansu in February 1899to go to Xiwanzi (西湾子镇), Xian of Chongli, Hebei Province, seat of the Apostolic Vicariate of Central Mongolia where he began work on a major seminary with a chapel and the residence of the Apostolic Vicar. At the same time begins the revolt of the Boxers who destroyed a large number of churches. Xiwanzi escaped this destruction thanks to the protection of the Western military. The support of Van Aertselaer, who has a Euro-centric conception with a predilection for the Gothic style, will allow De Moerloose to develop an important architectural activity. The archives of the Scheutist congregation in China were destroyed after their departure and those of Louvain are incomplete, making it difficult to reconstruct a list of all the buildings he may have built in China. These buildings have been parish churches, schools, orphanages, residences for missionaries, houses for cathecumenians, to meet the growing needs of the congregation. His reputation as

From 1903 to 1905, he worked on the Trappist abbey church of Notre-Dame-de-la-Consolation in Yangjiaping (禓家坪) founded in the spring of 1883 by Dom Efrem Seignol (1837-1893). He will then be tempted by this contemplative order. In December 1909, leaving the Scheutist congregation, he was incardinated in the apostolic vicariate of Peking which depended on a Lazarist bishop. He set up his studio in the enclosure of Yangjiaping Abbey, 180 km northwest of Beijing, from 1910  .

Between 1910 and 1920, he built several large neo-Gothic brick churches for Lazarist missionaries.

Constructed buildings 

 Beijing / Beijing, North Church (Beitang), interior decoration (1909) for Lazarist missionaries
 Datong (Shanxi), regional seminary (1922-1928)
 Gaojiayingzi (Hebei), parish church (1903-1905)
 Huangtuliang (Hebei), parish church (1906)
 Meiguiyinzi (Inner Mongolia), parish church (1904-1906)
 Nihewan (Hebei), chapel and residence (1912)
 Shanghai, Yangtze-poo parish church (1924-1926)
 Shanghai, Basilica of Sheshan , plans (1920-1923) for Jesuit missionaries, built by Jesuit Father François-Xavier Diniz .
 Shebiya / Chabernoor (Inner Mongolia), parish church (1904-1905)
 Shuangshuzi (Hebei), parish church and residence (1917)
 Xiwanzi / Chongli (Hebei), seminary (1902)
 Xuanhua (Hebei), church, later cathedral (1903-1906) for Lazarist missionaries
 Yangjiaping (Hebei), Trappist Abbey of Notre-Dame-de-Consolation (1903–1905 and 1922), daughter of Sept-Fons Abbey
 Yongping (Hebei), cathedral (1908-1910) for Lazarist missionaries
 Zhengding (Hebei), parish church (1924)

Notes and references 

 ↑ Koen De Ridder ed., Footsteps in Deserted Valleys: Missionary Cases. Strategies and Practice in Qing China, Leuven University Press ( Louvain Chinese Studies VIII collection), 2000, p.  170, ( ISBN  90-5867-022-8 ) (preview )  [ archive ]
 ↑ Thomas Coomans, Leung-kwok Prudence Lau, "The tribulations of a Belgian architect in China: Gustave Volckaert, in the service of the Crédit foncier d'Extrême-Orient, 1914-1954", in Revue belge d'archéologie et d'histoire of art, 2012, volume LXXXI, p.  129, 130, 132, 136, 152 (read online)  [ archive ]

Bibliography 
: Documents used as source for writing this article.

 Aubin Françoise, “A technical vocabulary notebook from Moerloose's RPA. CICM, missionary from Scheut (northern Gansu, end of the 19th century)”, Cahiers de Linguistique - Asie Orientale, 12/2, 1983, p.  103-117 ( read online )  [ archive ] 
 Thomas Coomans, “Pugin Worldwide. From Les Vrais Principes and the Belgian St Luke Schools to Northern China and Inner Mongolia”, in: Brittain-Catlin Timothy, De Maeyer Jan & Bressani Martin (eds.), Gothic Revival Worldwide: AWN Pugin's Global Influence (KADOC Artes 16), Leuven: Leuven University Press, 2016, p. 156-171 ( ISBN  978-9462700918 ) .
 Coomans Thomas, “Sint-Lucasneogotiek in Noord-China: Alphonse De Moerloose, missionaris en architect”, M&L. Monumenten, landschappen in archaeology, 32/5, 2013, p. 6-33 ( ( ISSN  0770-4984 ) ).
 Coomans Thomas, “Our Lady of Sheshan in Shanghai, Basilica of the French Jesuits in China”, Monumental Bulletin , 176/2, 2018, p.  129-156 , ( ISBN  978-2-901837-72-5 ) ( read online )  [ archive ]
 Thomas Coomans, “East Meets West on the Construction Site. Churches in China, 1840s-1930s”, Construction History , 33/2, 2018, p. 63-84 [ISSN 0267-7768].
 Coomans Thomas 高曼士 & Xu Yitao 徐怡涛, Building Churches in Northern China. A 1926 Handbook in Context /徐怡涛, 舶来与本土——1926年法国传教士所撰中国北方教堂营造之研究 , Beijing: Intellectual Property Rights Publishing House, 2016, 449 p. ( ISBN  978-7-5130-4144-7 ) .
 Coomans Thomas & Luo Wei 罗薇, “Exporting Flemish Gothic Architecture to China: Meaning and Context of the Churches of Shebiya (Inner Mongolia) and Xuanhua (Hebei) built by Missionary-Architect Alphonse De Moerloose in 1903-1906”, Relicta. Heritage Research in Flanders , 9, 2012, p.  219-262 ( read online )  [ archive ] 
 Luo Wei 罗薇, Transmission and Transformation of European Church Types in China: The Churches of the Scheut Missions beyond the Great Wall, 1865-1955 , KU Leuven, doctoral thesis (unpublished), Louvain, 2013, 505 p.
 Ulenaers Sonja, Alphons Frederik De Moerloose CICM (1858-1932), KU Leuven, degree thesis (unpublished), Louvain, 1994, 83 and XXXVIII p.
 Van Hecken Joseph, "Alphonse Frédéric De Moerloose CICM (1858-1932) and his work as an architect in China", Neue Zeitschrift für Missionwissenschaft / New review of missionary science , 24/3, 1968, p.  161-178.

1858 births
1932 deaths

20th-century Belgian architects
20th-century Belgian Roman Catholic priests
Roman Catholic missionaries in China